Charles Dorman may refer to:

Charles W. Dorman, military officer, attorney and judge
Charlie Dorman (1898–1928), baseball catcher
Red Dorman (1900–1974), Charles Dwight "Red" Dorman, baseball outfielder
Sir Charles Geoffrey Dorman, 3rd Baronet (1920–1996), of the Dorman baronets

See also
Dorman (surname)